Primospes suturalis is a species of beetle in the family Dytiscidae, the only species in the genus Primospes.

References

Dytiscidae